Michael Peter Fallon, M.D. (born September 1964) is a Colorado physician who was the 2010 Republican nominee to represent Colorado's 1st congressional district.

Early life and education
Fallon was born in September, 1964 to Barbara and Jim Fallon in an Army hospital in Fort Huachuca, Arizona. He has two brothers, T.J. and Sean, and one sister, Beth. He moved 15 times as a child because his father was in the military.

Fallon attended University of Texas at Austin, which he chose because tuition was affordable. He earned an undergraduate degree in Chemical Engineering, a major he chose because UT Austin did not offer premed. He then studied emergency medicine at University of Texas Health Science Center at Houston (UTHealth).

Fallon interned at Good Samaritan Regional Medical Center in Phoenix, Arizona and did his residency at Denver General, now known as Denver Health.

Medical career
After completing his residency, Fallon spent six years practicing emergency medicine, first in the Atlanta, Georgia area, and then back in Denver at Exempla Lutheran emergency group.

While at Exempla Lutheran, Fallon realized that "there were more affordable and effective ways to care for patients who visited the ER," so he started the first of three urgent care clinics in the Denver metropolitan area, where he served as "physician, business manager, janitor and snow remover."

In 2008, Fallon sold his urgent care clinics and returned to work as an ER Physician. He currently works in several emergency rooms throughout the region.

2010 U.S. Congressional campaign

Fallon's opponents in the general election were Democratic incumbent Diana DeGette, Libertarian nominee Clint Jones, Green nominee Gary Swing, and American Constitutional Party nominee Chris Styskal.

Fallon had never run for office before. He decided to run for office while listening to Dave Logan interview DeGette on NewsRadio 850 KOA regarding her support of the Affordable Health Care for America Act.

Fallon's campaign in the Democrat heavy district was characterized by informal "town hall meetings," often held at local pubs, and by "door-to-door" interaction with voters. Fallon has received support from many diverse groups, including Democrats in Denver's Park Hill neighborhood
and local gay activists.

On September 20, 2010, Fallon made national news when the NRCC upgraded him to "On the Radar" status - the first of three levels in their Young Guns Program.

The day after Fallon was granted "On the Radar" status, he was interviewed by Mike Rosen. The Mike Rosen show had previously denied a request from Fallon's campaign for an interview because they did not think he was a serious candidate. At the beginning of the interview, Rosen told listeners that they "ought to know more about Mike Fallon ... because his is a name that I think you'll be hearing in the future."

On September 22, 2010, DeGette sent an email to supporters, informing them of Fallon's "On the Radar" status, and requesting donations, stating that, "We can't take anything for granted this year." The fundraising request received significant local media attention.

A poll conducted by ccAdvertising on October 17–19, 2010, found Fallon to be trailing DeGette by 7.5 percent, 43.8 percent to 36.4 percent.

Dr. Fallon lost the November 2, 2010 election to Representative DeGette. The results, with 98 percent of precincts reporting, were Diana Degette 67.4 percent, Mike Fallon 28.8 percent, Gary Swing 1.3 percent, Clint Jones 1.3 percent, Chris Styskal 0.9 percent.

Political positions

Health Care
Fallon believes that, while the healthcare reform measures "set out to do some good things," such as creating high risk pools, increased access, and increased portability, the problem with the legislation is that it has not been paid for. Fallon says the legislation will cost 3, 4, or 5 times more than originally reported.

He has said he believes that ultimately the health care legislation will slowly push private entities out of the market - and push the American people toward single payer health care.

Fallon would like to remove the anti-trust exemption that health insurance companies currently enjoy, so that true free-market principles can bring down the cost of care. He also believes that entrepreneurial consumer-based medicine (in which he has experience from his background starting urgent care clinics) is part of the answer to our future in health care.

In response to his opponent's praise of the health care bill, Fallon was quoted as saying, "This new health reform bill helps quasi-government based hospitals, emergency rooms and community health centers — these benefits are the positive outcomes of this legislation, but, these centers of care are just a fraction of our entire health system. The news that two clinics at the University of Colorado Hospital will no longer take government insurance plans highlights a larger problem with this legislation. More and more private medical providers will no longer take government insurance plans, thus, reducing the access this bill portends to provide."

Personal life
Fallon and his wife, Sandy, have two small children.

References

External links
Mike Fallon for Congress official campaign site
 
Financial information at OpenSecrets.org

Video: "Colorado Decides" Mike Fallon: Candidate for 1st Congressional District Mike Fallon interviewed on Colorado Decides, Colorado Public Television 12, October 22, 2010

1964 births
Living people
Cockrell School of Engineering alumni
University of Texas Health Science Center at Houston alumni
Politicians from Denver
American emergency physicians
Colorado Republicans
Candidates in the 2010 United States elections
21st-century American politicians